Max-Morlock-Stadion is a stadium in Nuremberg, Germany, which was opened in 1928. It is located next to Zeppelinfeld. It also neighbors the Nuremberg Arena.

Since 1966, it has been home stadium to the German Bundesliga club 1. FC Nürnberg. During the 1972 Summer Olympics, it hosted six football matches. In 1967, it hosted the European Cup Winners' Cup final between Rangers and Bayern Munich. Bayern won 1–0.

The stadium hosted five games of the 2006 FIFA World Cup, including the famous match between Portugal and the Netherlands, consequently known as the Battle of Nuremberg.

Name
Originally it was known as the Städtisches Stadion  until 1945, when it was renamed Victory Stadium. In 1961, it returned to its original name until 1991, when it received the name Frankenstadion.

On 14 March 2006, the stadium was renamed easyCredit-Stadion  for a period of five years, after a sponsorship deal with the German bank DZ Bank. Many fans of the 1. FC Nuremberg, led by the "Ultras Nuremberg" introduced on 1 April 2006, held demonstration against the name and symbolically renamed the stadium with its current name, in honour of one of the best players in the club's history, Max Morlock. On 14 February 2013, the stadium was renamed Grundig Stadion ( or ), after a sponsorship deal with Grundig.

In July 2016, the stadium's name changed back to Stadion Nürnberg after the city of Nuremberg could not find a new sponsor. From 1 July 2017, the stadium's name officially became Max-Morlock-Stadion.

Facilities 
The available facilities at the stadium include two changing rooms for players, changing rooms for coaches, referees. Also physician and treatment rooms are available. A 300 m² press area, an area for press conferences, and three TV studios make the stadium a truly modern one. 1200 m² makes up the VIP area with room for 800 guests. To compensate for the large number of seats there are 15,000 parking spaces with 205 for VIPs.

The stadium also has track and field facilities that follow international regulation. A full sprinkler system, that feeds the grass with rain water. The pitch is also heated, and lit with a floodlight system. There are two 60 m² video walls that provide video to the fans. There is also a full power back up system, powered by diesel generators.

History 
Beginning in 1933, the National Socialists began to use the stadium as a marching area for the Hitler Youth. The fourth Deutsche Kampfspiele, one of the biggest events organized by the Nazi Sports Body, took place in this stadium from  23–29 July 1934.

Following 1963, the stadium was reconditioned multiple times, so that it could meet the requirements for football in the Bundesliga.

Renovations 
Max-Morlock-Stadion has been renovated twice, firstly from 1988 to 1991, and then again in 2002, to be ready in time for both the 2005 FIFA Confederations Cup and the 2006 World Cup. The 2002 renovation cost €56.2 million which was split between the city of Nürnberg, the State of Bavaria and the building society, which managed the stadium. This modernisation (designed and realized by HPP Architects) increased the capacity to 48,548 by extending the southwest and northwest grandstand. The playing field was lowered by 1.30 metres in order to provide all seats with an unrestricted view of the field. The Max-Morlock-Platz was developed as a place for fans to meet and enjoy something to eat; the total area of this place is 1,000 square metres. In the summer of 2012, the capacity was increased to 50,000.

Concerts
The Monsters of Rock Tour 1984, originally planned on the Zeppelinfield, took place in the Städtisches Stadion.

P!nk performed at the stadium on July 15, 2010 during the Funhouse Summer Carnival.

Rock im Park takes place at this stadium.

Transportation 
The stadium and the adjacent Nuremberg Arena are well serviced by public transportation to facilitate transport of fans from and to the various sports and musical events taking place there:

 Bus stop Max-Morlock-Platz, right in front of the stadium. Serviced by Bus line 55
 Frankenstadion station, about 400 Meters (1300 ft) or a 5-minute walk from the stadium. Serviced by S-Bahn line S2
 Dutzendteich station and tramway stop, about 1300 m (4000 ft) or a 10-minute walk from the stadium. Services by Bus lines 55 and 65, Tramway line 6 and S-Bahn line S2
 ''Messe subway station, about 1800 m (5500 ft) or a 15-minute walk from the Stadium. Serviced by U-Bahn (Subway) lines U1 and U11

During mass sports and entertainment events, such as Bundesliga games or the annual Rock im Park festival, additional S-Bahn trains running between main station and Frankenstadion station are being put into service. Before the 2006 FIFA World Cup, Frankenstadion station had the length of its existing platform doubled and an additional platform built for that purpose.

2006 FIFA World Cup 
The stadium was one of the venues for the 2006 FIFA World Cup. The following games were played at the stadium during the tournament:

References

External links

 1972 Summer Olympics official report. Volume 1. Part 1. p. 121.
 1972 Summer Olympics official report. Volume 3. p. 359.
 1.FC Nuernberg stadium profile.
 FIFA World Cup 2006 profile
 Football.co.uk profile

2006 FIFA World Cup stadiums
2005 FIFA Confederations Cup stadiums
Venues of the 1972 Summer Olympics
Olympic football venues
Football venues in Germany
Athletics (track and field) venues in Germany
Buildings and structures in Nuremberg
1. FC Nürnberg
Sports venues completed in 1928